Majchrowski (feminine: Majchrowska, plural: Majchrowscy) is a Polish surname. Notable people with the surname include:

 Jacek Majchrowski (born 1947), Polish historian and politician
 Stefan Majchrowski (1908-1988), Polish writer

Polish-language surnames